Velika Dobrava is a village east of Višnja Gora in the Municipality of Ivančna Gorica in central Slovenia. The area is part of the historical region of Lower Carniola. The municipality is now included in the Central Slovenia Statistical Region.

Church

The local church is dedicated to Saint James and belongs to the Parish of Višnja Gora. It was first mentioned in written documents dating to 1507.

References

External links

Velika Dobrava on Geopedia

Populated places in the Municipality of Ivančna Gorica